Ian Whates is a British speculative fiction author and editor. In 2006 he launched the independent publishing house NewCon Press. He lives with his partner Helen in Cambridgeshire.

As of 2009 Whates is currently a director of both the Science Fiction Writers of America (SFWA) and the British Science Fiction Association (BSFA). He has had short fiction published in Nature, Hub and TQR. In 2007 his short story The Gift of Joy was nominated for the British Science Fiction Award. His space opera novel,  Pelquin's Comet (The Dark Angels Book 1), was published in 2015.

Bibliography

City of a Hundred Rows 
 City of Dreams & Nightmare (2010)
 City of Hope & Despair (2011)
 City of Light & Shadow (2012)

Noise 
 The Noise Within (2010)
 The Noise Revealed (2011)

The Dark Angels 
 Pelquin's Comet (2015)
 The Ion Raiders (2017)
 Dark Angels Rising (2020)

Collections 
 The Gift of Joy (2009)

Short stories and essays 
 The Gun published in Speculative Realms Anthology, 2008; ebook re-released by Kayelle Press in 2013
 In Praise of Short Stories by Ian Whates published in Story Behind the Book : Volume 1, 2013;
 Return to Arden Falls in the 2013's "Legends", a collection of short stories in honor of David Gemmell.

As editor 
 Solaris Rising (2011)
 Solaris Rising 1.5 (2012)
 Solaris Rising 2 (2013)
 Solaris Rising 3

References

External links
NewCon press website

Solaris Rising 2 review at Upcoming4.me
Ian Whates official forum

Living people
English science fiction writers
Science fiction editors
Year of birth missing (living people)
Male speculative fiction editors